Pozzitive Television is a production company formed by producers Geoff Posner and David Tyler in 1992. Pozzitive have won awards including six BAFTAs, two Golden Roses at Montreux, multiple British Comedy & RTS awards, seven Sony Awards and two International Emmys.

About 

Pozzitive Television was founded by Geoff Posner & David Tyler. Since then, Pozzitive has worked with major comic talent in the UK, including Victoria Wood, Steve Coogan, and Armando Iannucci.

Pozzitive has earned a reputation as one of the leading indie production companies in the UK - from producing the very first independent comedy ever to air on Radio 4, Jeremy Hardy Speaks to the Nation, to the recent success of Cabin Pressure, which became the first radio sitcom to be named 'Comedy of the Year' in 2014.

Recent productions

Radio 

The 3rd Degree, series 1–10, 2010–2020.
Agendum, series 1–2, 2017-2019
British Troll Farm, pilot, 2019
Giles Wemmbley-Hogg Goes Off... Article 50
The Hauntening, series 1–3, 2017-2020
Jack & Millie, series 1–2, 2017-2020
Kevin Eldon Will See You Now, series 1–4, 2012–2019.
Little Brexit, 2019
Shush!, series 1–2, 2015-2017
Thanks A Lot, Milton Jones!, series 1–4, 2014-2020
When Jeremy Hardy Spoke To The Nation

Previous productions

Radio 

The Cabaret Upstairs, 1985.
The Big Fun Show, 1987.
Dial M For Pizza, series 1 and 2, 1987–1988.
Hey Rrradio, pilot, 1988.
Live on Arrival, pilot, 1988.
Radio Active, series 6 and 7, 1986–1987.
The Woody Allen Reader, 1988.
At Home with the Hardys (also known as Unnatural Acts), 1987–1990.
Jeremy Hardy Speaks to the Nation, series 1–10, 1993–2014.
Crown Jewels, series 1 & 2, 1995.
King Stupid, 1998.
The Very World of Milton Jones, series 1–3, 1998–2001.
The 99p Challenge, series 2–5, 2000–2004.
Giles Wemmbley-Hogg Goes Off, series 1–5, 2002-2019
The House of Milton Jones, 2003.
Another Case of Milton Jones, series 1–5, 2005–2011.
Armando Iannucci's Charm Offensive, series 1–4, 2005–2008.
Deep Trouble, series 1 & 2, 2005–2007.
The Castle, series 1–4, 2007–2012.
Cabin Pressure, series 1–4, 2008–2013.
The Genuine Particle, 2008.
Bigipedia, series 1 & 2, 2009–2011.
Jo Caulfield Won't Shut Up, 2009.
My First Planet, series 1–2, 2012–2014.
Strap In - It's Clever Peter!, series 1, 2012.
The Lentil Sorters - series 1, 2015
The Brig Society, series 1–4, 2013-2016
John Finnemore's Double Acts, series 1–2, 2015 - 2017

Television 

John Sessions's Tall Tales, 1991
The Doug Anthony All Stars, 1992
Introducing Tony Ferrino - Who? And Why? - A Quest, 1993
The Tony Ferrino Phenomenon, 1993.
The Imaginatively Titled Punt & Dennis Show, 1994.
Pauline Calf's Wedding Video - "Three Fights, Two Weddings & A Funeral", 1994.
The Marriage of Figaro, 1994
Paul Calf's Video Diary, 1994.
Coogan's Run, 1995.
The Big Snog, 1995
Lights, Camera, Magic, 1995
Cows, 1997.
Harry Enfield and Christmas Chums, 1997
Dinnerladies, series 1 & 2, 1998–2000.
Stephen Fry's 'Live From The Lighthouse', 1998.
TLC, 2001.
Gash, 2003.
The Strategic Humour Initiative, 2003.
The Comic Side of 7 Days, series 1 & 2, 2004–5.
Little Miss Jocelyn, 2006
Giles Wemmbley Hogg Goes Off... To Glastonbury, 2007.
Music Hall Meltdown, 2007.
Saturday Live Again!, 2007.
One Night Only, 2008.

Notable awards

The 3rd Degree
Rose D'or Radio Game Show - Winner (2015)

The 99p Challenge
Sony Award Silver - Winner (2004)

Agendum
BBC Audio Drama Awards, Best Scripted Comedy - Nominee (2018)

Another Case of Milton Jones
Chortle Awards, Best Use of Stand Up on TV or Radio - Nominee (2009)
British Comedy Awards, Best British Radio Sitcom - Winner (2010)
British Comedy Awards, Best British Radio Sitcom - Nominee (2011)
Sony Award Silver - Winner (2011)
Writers Guild Award - Nominee (2012)

Armando Iannucci's Charm Offensive
Sony Award Bronze - Winner (2006)

The Brig Society
New York International Radio Programme Awards - Best Regularly Scheduled Comedy programme - Finalist (2014)
Writers' Guild Award - Winner (2014)
BBC Audio Drama Awards - Best Scripted Comedy (Live Audience) - Nominee (2015)
New York International Radio Programme Awards - Best Regularly Scheduled Comedy programme - Silver Award Winner (2015)
New York International Radio Programme Awards - Best Regularly Scheduled Comedy programme - Finalist (2016)
BBC Audio Drama Awards - Best Scripted Comedy - Nominee (2017)

Cabin Pressure
Writers' Guild Award - Nominee (2009)
Writer's Guild Award - Nominee (2010)
Writer's Guild Award - Winner (2011)
BBC Audio Drama Award - Best Scripted Comedy Drama - Nominee (2011)
British Comedy Awards - Best British Radio Sitcom - Winner (2011)
Broadcasting Press Guild Awards - Best Radio Show - Nominee (2012)
British Comedy Awards - Best British Radio Sitcom - Winner (2013)
BBC Audio Drama Award - Best Scripted Comedy Drama - Nominee (2014)
BBC Audio Drama Award - Best Scripted Comedy (Studio Audience) - Nominee (2014)
New York International Radio Programme Awards - Best Regularly Scheduled Comedy programme - Bronze Award Winner (2014)
British Comedy Awards - Best British Radio Sitcom - Winner (2014)
British Comedy Awards - Comedy Of The Year - Winner (2014)
New York International Radio Programme Awards - Best Regularly Scheduled Comedy programme - Gold Award Winner (2015)
BBC Audio Drama Award - Best Scripted Comedy Drama - Nominee (2015)
BBC Audio Drama Award - Best Actor in an Audio Drama - Roger Allam - Nominee (2015)

Crown Jewels
Sony Award Bronze - Winner (1996)

Giles Wemmbley Hogg Geht Zum FussballWeltmeisterschaft Weg
Sony Award Silver - Winner (2006)

Giles Wemmbley Hogg Goes Off "Article 50"
BBC Audio Drama Awards - Best Scripted Comedy - Nominee (2020)

The Hauntening
Writers Guild Awards - Best Radio Comedy - Nominee (2020)

Jeremy Hardy Feels It
New York International Radio Programme Awards - Best Regularly Scheduled Comedy programme - Finalist (2018)

Jeremy Hardy Speaks to the Nation
Sony Award Bronze - Winner (1995)
Writers' Guild Award - Nominee (1995)
Sony Award - Nominee (2004)
Rose D'Or Radio Comedy Award - Nominee (2014)

John Finnemore's Double Acts
BBC Audio Drama Award - Best Scripted Comedy Drama - Nominee (2015)
British Comedy Awards - Best British Radio Sitcom - Winner (2015)
Writers Guild Award - Winner (2016)
ARIAS Best Fictional Storytelling - Nominee (2017)
Writers' Guild Award - Nominee (2017)
BBC Audio Drama Award - Best Scripted Comedy - Nominee (2017)
BBC Audio Drama Award - Best Actress - Nominee, Julia McKenzie (2017)
Tinniswood Award for Best Audio Drama Script - Special Commendation (2018)

Kevin Eldon Will See You Now
Rose D'Or Radio Comedy - Nominee (2015)
Writers' Guild Award - Nominee (2017)
New York International Radio Programme Awards - Best Regularly Scheduled Comedy programme - Finalist (2018)
BBC Audio Drama Awards - Best Scripted Comedy - Finalist (2020)

Radio Production Awards
Best Entertainment Producer - David Tyler - Nominee (2010)
Best Entertainment Producer - David Tyler - Nominee (2011)
Best Entertainment Producer - David Tyler - Winner (2013)
Best Comedy/Entertainment Producer - David Tyler Nominee (2014)
Best Comedy/Entertainment Producer - David Tyler - Winner (2015)
Special GOLD Award - David Tyler - Winner (2015)
Best Comedy Producer - David Tyler Winner (Bronze, 2017)
Gethin Thomas Award for Best Comedy Producer - David Tyler - Nominee (2018)

Shush!
New York International Radio Programme Awards - Best Regularly Scheduled Comedy programme - Bronze Award Winner (2016)

Thanks A Lot, Milton Jones!
New York International Radio Programme Awards - Best Regularly Scheduled Comedy programme - Finalist (2014)
New York International Radio Programme Awards - Best Regularly Scheduled Comedy programme - Silver Award Winner (2016)
BBC Audio Drama Awards - Best Scripted Comedy (Sketch Show) - Nominee (2018)

The Very World of Milton Jones
British Comedy Award - Best Radio Comedy - Nominee (1998)
Sony Award Bronze - Winner (2008)

References

External links
Official site
Pozzitive Television at IMDB

Mass media companies established in 1992
Television production companies of the United Kingdom